The current Malaysian Minister of Domestic Trade and Living Costs has been Salahuddin Ayub since 3 December 2022. The minister is supported by Deputy Minister of Domestic Trade and Living Costs. The minister administers the portfolio through the Ministry of Domestic Trade and Living Costs.

List of ministers of domestic trade
The following individuals have been appointed as Minister of Trade, or any of its precedent titles:

Political Party:

List of minister of living costs
The following individuals have been appointed as Minister of Living Costs, or any of its precedent titles:

Political Party:

List of ministers of consumer affairs
The following individuals have been appointed as Minister of Consumer Affairs, or any of its precedent titles:

Political Party:

References

Ministry of Domestic Trade and Consumer Affairs (Malaysia)
Lists of government ministers of Malaysia
Trade ministers